Bible in the Schools is a 501(c)(3) not-for-profit located in Chattanooga, Tennessee, that promotes biblical literacy in  Hamilton County.

Mission
The organization develops curriculum, training and financial resources for elective, for-credit courses in Bible history, using the Bible as the text, taught in a controlled curriculum by trained and certified middle and high school teachers employed by the  Hamilton County school system. The group works with other organizations with similar goals and consults with individuals, sponsorship groups and school districts across the nation.

History
In 1922, J. P. McCallie, a co-founder of The McCallie School and chair of the Religious Work Committee of the Chattanooga YMCA,  approached the Chattanooga City Commission to provide Bible courses adapted to the various ages from 4th grade through high school, taught by teachers selected and paid by the Bible Study Committee, and that were subject to the principals and the Board of Education in scholarship and discipline. The program was approved and later expanded into the Hamilton County Schools. In the 2020-2021 academic year, 4,615 public school students took a Bible History course.

Curriculum
Bible History elective classes in Hamilton County public schools are an opportunity for middle and high school students to have a viewpoint neutral, foundational study – at no cost to taxpayers – of one of the cornerstone texts of world history, which helps students become culturally literate and better equipped to thrive and contribute to a global world. Five course options are offered by licensed and state-certified teachers. Classes are for-credit and considered part of the Social Studies curriculum in the high schools and the Related Arts curriculum in the middle schools. The courses are non-sectarian and are taught as history and literature.

References

External links
Official site

1922 establishments in Tennessee
Christian organizations established in 1922
Religious education in the United States
Religious charities based in the United States
Charities based in Tennessee
Organizations based in Chattanooga, Tennessee